Ronny Kriwat (born 31 March 1987) is a Brazilian actor.

Kriwat studied Business Administration at Mackenzie, in São Paulo. For being a little shy, he decided to take theater classes to lose his shyness. He liked the stage and began to invest in his career. In 2009, he made his television debut in the telenovela Cama de Gato.

Filmography

Television

Film

Theater

References

External links
 

1987 births
21st-century Brazilian male actors
Brazilian male film actors
Brazilian male stage actors
Brazilian male telenovela actors
Brazilian male television actors
Living people
Male actors from São Paulo